The Blues of Pink Anderson: Ballad & Folksinger, subtitled Vol. 3, is an album by blues musician Pink Anderson recorded in 1961 and released on the Bluesville label in 1963.

Reception

AllMusic reviewer Lindsay Planer stated: "Astute listeners will note that three of the titles – "The Titanic," "John Henry," and "The Wreck of the Old 97" – were duplicated from Anderson's side-long contribution to Gospel, Blues & Street Songs.  ,,. However Anderson's delivery is notably different when comparing the two performances. One of the primary discrepancies lies in the pacing. Here, the readings are more definite and seemingly less rushed. The same is true for the phrasing of Anderson's vocals ... The intricate and somewhat advanced guitar-playing – that became one of Anderson's trademarks – is arguably more pronounced on these recordings as well".

Track listing
All compositions are uncredited traditional blues
 "The Titanic" – 4:04
 "Boll Weevil" – 3:58
 "John Henry" – 4:58
 "Betty and Dupree" – 4:42
 "Sugar Babe" – 2:40
 "Wreck of the Old '97" – 4:38
 "I Will Fly Away" – 3:44
 "The Kaiser" – 2:02
 "In the Evening" – 3:17

Personnel

Performance
Pink Anderson – guitar, vocals

Production
 Kenneth S. Goldstein – producer
 Samuel B. Charters – engineer

References

Pink Anderson albums
1963 albums
Bluesville Records albums